County of Derby may refer to:
 Derbyshire, England, United Kingdom
 County of Derby (South Australia)
 County of Derby, Queensland, Australia